Patrick or Pat Sullivan may refer to:

Sports
 Pat Sullivan (American football) (1950–2019), American football player and coach
 Patrick Sullivan (American football executive), former New England Patriots general manager
 Pat Sullivan (third baseman) (1861–1901), American baseball player
 Pat Sullivan (manager) (1854–1896), American baseball manager
 Pat Sullivan (basketball) (born 1971), American basketball coach
 Patrick Sullivan (footballer) (born 1982), football player for Shamrock Rovers
 Pat Sullivan (soccer) (born 1971), Canadian former soccer player

Politicians
 Patrick Joseph Sullivan (1865–1935), US senator for Wyoming
 Patrick Sullivan (Wyoming politician), member of the Wyoming House of Representatives
 Patrick J. Sullivan (Pennsylvania politician) (1877–1946), US congressman for Pennsylvania
 Pat Sullivan (politician) (born 1962), politician in the State of Washington

Others
 Pat Sullivan (film producer) (1887–1933), Australian film producer and animator
 Pat Sullivan (programmer), American software engineer
 Pat Sullivan (trade unionist) (born 1893), Irish-born Canadian trade union leader
 Patrick F. Sullivan, American psychiatric geneticist
 Patrick Sullivan, character in The Accidental Husband
 Patrick Sullivan, real name of actor Barry Sullivan

See also
 Patrick O'Sullivan (disambiguation)
 Patricia Sullivan (disambiguation),